This page provides the summaries of the CAF second round matches for the 2010 FIFA World Cup qualification  and the 2010 Africa Cup of Nations. The 48 qualifiers (45 direct entrants plus 3 winners of the first round) were split into 12 groups of four in the draw held in Durban, South Africa, on 25 November 2007. Teams in each group played a home-and-away round-robin in 2008, with the 12 groups winners and 8 best runners-up advancing to the third round. As not all groups were of equal size after the exclusion of Ethiopia and the withdrawal of Eritrea, when ranking the runners-up, their results against their group's 4th placed team would not be counted.

Seeding 
One team from each of the following pots was drawn into each group.

Particular cases: Angola and South Africa 
 Due to the fact that the second round was also the qualifying round for the 2010 Africa Cup of Nations, South Africa took part, despite to the fact they hosted the 2010 FIFA World Cup. South Africa participated in one of the twelve groups, but ultimately failed to qualify for the Africa Cup of Nations tournament in Angola.
 Angola hosted the 2010 Africa Cup of Nations but participated in this round so as to attempt progression to the third round of CAF qualifiers. Angola, however, did not qualify.

Group 1

Group 2

Group 3

Group 4

Group 5

Group 6 

Eight people, all young men, were crushed to death by crowds before this match outside the stadium.

Group 7

Group 8 

Ethiopia were excluded from the competition on 2008-09-12 due to FIFA's suspension of the Ethiopian Football Federation, and the results of their matches were annulled.

Group 9

Group 10

Group 11 

Eritrea withdrew from the qualifiers on 25 March 2008 and were not replaced.

Group 12

Rankings of runners-up 
Along with the 12 group winners, the 8 best runners-up also advanced to the third round.  In determining the rankings of the runners-up, results against the fourth-placed team (for groups with 4 teams) would be excluded (and are hence excluded from the table below).

Goalscorers
There were 356 goals scored over 136 games, for an average of 2.62 goals per game.
7 goals

 Moumouni Dagano

6 goals

 Razak Omotoyossi
 Samuel Eto'o

5 goals

 Ismaël Bangoura
 Frédéric Kanouté

4 goals

 Shabani Nonda
 Junior Agogo
 Dennis Oliech
 Seydou Keita
 Youssef Safri
 Emmanuel Adebayor

3 goals

 Flávio Amado
 Yssouf Koné
 Dady
 Zola Matumona
 Dieumerci Mbokani
 Emad Moteab
 Sekou Cissé
 Boubacar Sanogo
 Esau Kanyenda
 Chiukepo Msowoya
 Wilko Risser
 Ikechukwu Uche
 Jerson Tegete
 Adékamni Olufadé

2 goals

 Antar Yahia
 Karim Ziani
 Diphetogo Selolwane
 Mahamoudou Kéré
 Henri Mbazumutima
 Claude Nahimana
 Albert Meyong Ze
 Léger Djimrangar
 Hilaire Kédigui
 Wilfried Urbain Elvis Endzanga
 Lys Mouithys
 Mohamed Aboutrika
 Ahmed Eid Abdel Malek
 Ahmed Hassan
 Amr Zaky
 Fabrice Do Marcolino
 Bruno Zita Mbanangoyé
 Roguy Méyé
 Njogu Demba-Nyrén
 Tijan Jaiteh
 Laryea Kingston
 Prince Tagoe
 Pascal Feindouno
 Olivier Makor
 Moses Chavula
 Robert Ng'ambi
 Sidi Yaya Keita
 Wesley Marquette
 Youssef Hadji
 Rudolph Bester
 Alhassane Issoufou
 Joseph Yobo
 Labama Bokota
 Olivier Karekezi
 Saïd Makasi
 El Hadji Diouf
 Cheikh Gueye
 Philip Zialor
 Kagiso Dikgacoi
 Faisal Agab
 Muhannad El Tahir
 Haytham Tambal
 Siza Dlamini
 Collen Salelwako
 Danny Mrwanda
 Chaouki Ben Saada
 Hichem Essifi
 Issam Jemâa
 Geofrey Massa
 Eugene Sseppuya
 Gilbert Mushangazhike

1 goal

 Rafik Djebbour
 Rafik Saïfi
 Yamba Asha
 Ricardo Job Estévão
 Gilberto
 Zé Kalanga
 Locó
 Mantorras
 António Mendonça
 Khaled Adénon
 Jocelyn Ahouéya
 Stéphane Sessègnon
 Oumar Tchomogo
 Séïdath Tchomogo
 Boitumelo Mafoko
 Aristide Bancé
 Charles Kaboré
 Selemani Ndikumana
 Gustave Bebbe
 André Bikey
 Achille Emaná
 Jean Makoun
 Rigobert Song
 Somen Tchoyi
 Babanco
 Lito
 José Semedo
 Marco Soares
 Armand Djerabe
 Syriakata Hassan
 Marius Mbaiam
 Gervais Batota
 Franchel Ibara
 Edson Minga
 Hérita Ilunga
 Lomana LuaLua
 Tresor Mputu
 Tsholola Tshinyama
 Ahmed Daher
 Moussa Hirir
 Hosny Abd Rabo
 Rodolfo Bodipo
 Juvenal Edjogo-Owono
 Juan Ramón Epitié
 Ronan Carolino Falcão
 Bruno Ecuele Manga
 Stéphane N'Guéma
 Ousman Jallow
 Mustapha Jarju
 Matthew Amoah
 Stephen Appiah
 Sulley Muntari
 Mamadou Bah
 Kamil Zayatte
 Kanga Akalé
 Salomon Kalou
 Bakari Koné
 Didier Zokora
 Mohammed Jamal
 Austin Makacha
 McDonald Mariga
 Francis Ouma
 Lehlohonolo Seema
 Sello Muso
 Zah Rahan Krangar
 Dioh Williams
 Osama Al Fazzani
 Younes Al Shibani
 Omar Daoud
 Ahmed Saad Osman
 Hesham Shaban
 Guy Mamihasindrahona
 Stephan Rabemananjara
 Elvis Kafoteka
 Joseph Kamwendo
 Noel Mkandawire
 Atusaye Nyondo
 Adama Coulibaly
 Soumaila Coulibaly
 Dominique Da Silva
 Dahmed Ould Teguedi
 Andy Sophie
 Abdessalam Benjelloun
 Nabil El Zhar
 Houssine Kharja
 Tarik Sektioui
 Merouane Zemmama
 Eugénio Fernando Bila
 Carlitos
 Domingues
 Almiro Lobo
 Miro
 Dário Monteiro
 Tico-Tico
 Costa Khaiseb
 Paulus Shipanga
 Ismaël Alassane
 Daouda Kamilou
 Moussa Mallam
 Yakubu
 Obinna Nwaneri
 Christian Obodo
 Peter Odemwingie
 Chidi Odiah
 Bobo Bola
 Henri Camara
 Salif Diao
 Abdoulaye Faye
 Kader Mangane
 Ibrahima Sonko
 Don Annacoura
 Bertrand St. Ange
 Kewullay Conteh
 Mohammed Kallon
 Sheriff Suma
 Thembinkosi Fanteni
 Surprise Moriri
 Siphiwe Tshabalala
 Ahmed Aadil
 Saif Eldin Ali Idris Farah
 Ala'a Eldin Yousif
 Athuman Iddy
 Nizar Khalfan
 Khalfan Ngassa
 Shadrack Nsajigwa
 Moustapha Salifou
 Tijani Belaid
 Saber Ben Frej
 Fahid Ben Khalfallah
 Radhi Jaïdi
 Yassin Mikari
 Timothy Batabaire
 David Obua
 Ibrahim Sekagya
 Dan Wagaluka
 Christopher Katongo
 Felix Katongo
 Cuthbert Malajila
 Esrom Nyandoro

1 own goal

 Said Riyad (playing against Egypt)
 Bruno Ecuele Manga (playing against Libya)
 Pascal Anicet (playing against Benin)
 Kassaly Daouda (playing against Angola)
 Joseph Yobo (playing against Sierra Leone)
 Cheikh Gueye (playing against Algeria)

Notes

References 

2010 FIFA World Cup qualification (CAF)
Qual